Chandrupatla is a village in Jayashankar Bhupalpally in Telangana state, India. It falls under Wazeedu mandal. 
The major occupation in this village is agriculture (Paddy and Mirchi). It is connected to Wazeedu by the road way.  

Chandrupatla village on google maps  

Villages in Khammam district